Ammar Campa-Najjar (born February 24, 1989) is an American perennial candidate and former official at the United States Department of Labor. Campa-Najjar has twice been a candidate for the United States House of Representatives. He lost in the 2018 election against incumbent Duncan D. Hunter. Campa-Najjar lost again in a 2020 campaign to represent California's 50th congressional district, which encompasses the northeastern segments of San Diego County, and a small section of Riverside County. In 2022, he unsuccessfully ran for the position of Mayor of Chula Vista, California.

Early life and education 
Campa-Najjar was born in La Mesa, California, and raised in Jamul and Chula Vista, California. His father, Yasser Najjar, is Palestinian, and his mother, Abigail Campa, is Mexican American. In 1997, when he was eight years old, he and his family moved to the Gaza Strip. In 1998, he attended a Catholic school in the Gaza Strip. After living in Gaza for four years, he, his mother, and brother moved back to San Diego County. He said he was not "Arab enough in Gaza, Latino enough for the barrio, or American enough in my own country." When he was 15, he worked as a janitor to help his single mother pay bills.

While in high school, Campa-Najjar converted from Islam to Christianity. He considers himself to be Latino and Arab-American, and is fluent in English, Spanish, and Arabic.

He attended community college at Southwestern College, and earned a dual Bachelor of Arts degree in Philosophy and Psychology from San Diego State University.

Family 
Campa-Najjar's father Yasser Najjar is Palestinian and his mother Abigail Campa is Mexican American. His mother is a practicing Catholic. Following the killing of Campa-Najjar's father's parents by Israeli commandos for his grandfather Abu Najjar's involvement in Black September and alleged role in the 1972 Munich Massacre, Campa-Najjar's father Yasser Najjar and his siblings were sent to Cairo by King Hassan II of Morocco. The siblings were separated over the following years with Yasser attending school in England before immigrating to the US and obtaining American citizenship. He moved to San Diego in 1981 and earned an MBA from San Diego State University. Abigail Campa grew up in the Logan Heights neighborhood of San Diego, and she and Yasser married in the 1980s. In 1994, Yasser traveled to Gaza to work for the newly legitimized Palestinian National Authority and explore his family's roots. While working for the PNA he was seen as a moderate who advocated for peace. In his later years Yasser Najjar was an important internal critic of Palestinian hardliners. During his time in Gaza he attempted to counteract the rising influence of Hamas.

Campa-Najjar's grandfather Muhammad Youssef al-Najjar, known as "Abu Youssef", has been the subject of significant controversy. In 1965, while working in Kuwait, Abu Youssef founded Fatah along with Yasser Arafat and other exiled Palestinians. He was long believed to have been affiliated with the Munich massacre. He was among those targeted in Israeli retribution attacks known as Operation Wrath of God. On April 9, 1973 al-Najjar and his wife were killed in their Beirut, Lebanon apartment in Operation Spring of Youth, an Israeli commando raid targeting three Palestinian leaders carried out as part of Operation Wrath of God. The attack occurred while their children were home. The Israeli commando team was lead future Prime Minister Ehud Barak. Campa-Najjar and Barak met in Washington, D.C. in October 2019.

In February 2018, a book published by Ronen Bergman, Rise and Kill First, challenged the historical assumption that those targeted in Operation Wrath of God were actually behind the Munich massacre. In 2019 in response to this new information, Campa-Najjar withdrew some of the condemnations he had made against his grandfather.

Career 
Campa-Najjar worked as a deputy regional field director for the Barack Obama 2012 presidential campaign. During the Obama Administration, Campa-Najjar was a White House intern and briefly worked in the Labor Department's Office of Public Affairs for the Employment and Training Administration. As a White House intern, his clerical responsibilities included reading and helping select letters that President Obama would read each day.

He also worked for the United States Hispanic Chamber of Commerce as the communications and marketing director. In this capacity, he prepared to interview then-candidate Donald Trump, who ultimately pulled out of the scheduled event, despite having earlier told Geraldo Rivera in an interview that he would attend. Following the election, NBC News and The San Diego Union-Tribune published his op ed, with a slightly different version published by The Washington Post a few days later, expressing his faith in America despite Trump's election. "Let's not seek comfort in the easy traps of either normalizing or demonizing the decision half of America has made. We must do what is hard, what is necessary and what is right."

In 2017, The Hill published another op ed by Campa-Najjar where he advocated for enhanced vetting and the empowerment of moderate Muslims to help end terrorism. He has advocated for apprenticeship programs that pay people as they learn, for example the Registered Apprenticeship job training initiative, which has bipartisan support.

2018 congressional campaign 
Campa-Najjar cited the call to service in Barack Obama's farewell address as an inspiration to run for Congress. Campa-Najjar supports environmentally sustainable developments, including solar farms. Campa-Najjar advocated for registering young people to vote, especially those who would be 18 by 2018, because they would be on the receiving end of climate change and increasing levels of indebtedness. His top domestic issue was training Americans to fill job vacancies, and his top international issue was the Israeli–Palestinian conflict, and he opposed Trump's suggested wall with Mexico and travel ban. He cited economic inequality as a top issue facing California, "other than the severe droughts and fires." The district in which he ran for office was about 35% Latino and 15% voters of Middle Eastern descent.

On February 2, 2018, The San Diego Union-Tribune reported that Campa-Najjar had out-raised both the Republican incumbent, Duncan Hunter, and his Democratic rival, Josh Butner. On June 5, 2018, Campa-Najjar placed second in the nonpartisan blanket primary, earning a chance to compete against Hunter in November. Campa-Najjar credited support from Our Revolution as an important factor in the primary victory. The Union-Tribune endorsed Campa-Najjar, citing the "lunacy" of incumbent Hunter.

He lost the 2018 election with 48.3% of the votes to Hunter's 51.7%.

Campaign controversies 
During the campaign, the Duncan D. Hunter campaign ran an ad in which it claimed that Campa-Najjar had received support from the Council on American–Islamic Relations and the Muslim Brotherhood. PolitiFact found the claim to be false. In October 2018, Duncan L. Hunter, Hunter's father, attacked Campa-Najjar as a security risk.

Campa-Najjar's 2018 candidacy attracted international attention due to allegations that Muhammad Youssef al-Najjar, his paternal grandfather, was involved with the 1972 Munich massacre. He acknowledged and denounced the alleged crimes of his grandfather, who died 16 years before he was born.

Campa-Najjar's campaign received a notable degree of coverage following the indictment of his opponent for stealing campaign funds for personal use. Hunter's scandal gave his campaign a boost. His loss garnered additional coverage because of the use of anti-Muslim stereotypes against a non-Muslim candidate. However, Campa-Najjar said that he did not blame bigotry for his defeat.

2020 congressional campaign 
In 2019, Campa-Najjar announced that he would run for the same seat again in 2020. He announced his candidacy on Twitter a day after filing his paperwork with the FEC. He stated that his 2020 campaign would run on the dual platform of economic security and national security. Campa-Najjar said that for the election he would make a more concerted effort to reach out to conservative voters, especially veterans.

Initially characterized as a progressive during his 2018 run, Campa-Najjar walked back his support of Medicare for All and a Green New Deal, calling the latter "impractical". In October 2020, a podcaster posted screenshots purporting to show Campa-Najjar identifying as a blue dog Democrat who intended to become an independent if elected in 2020.

Under election rules in California, the top two vote-getters in the March 3, 2020, primary, regardless of party affiliation, later faced each other in the general election. Campa-Najjar placed first in the primary, and faced a November runoff election against Republican former Congressman Darrell Issa. Polls show a competitive election in the 50th district, which the Union-Tribune described as "a statistical dead heat".

On October 25, 2020, the Union-Tribune reported that Campa-Najjar had been out-raised by Republican candidate Darrell Issa. The newspaper endorsed Campa-Najjar, citing him as "a breath of fresh air," in contrast to long-term congressman Issa "saying derogatory things".

Campa-Najjar eventually lost in the 2020 election against Issa.

2022 mayoral campaign 
In 2022, Ammar unsuccessfully ran for the position of Mayor of Chula Vista, California — a city in San Diego County's South Bay region that is outside of the congressional district he previously claimed residency in. 

In the June Primary election, Ammar received 22.56% of the vote, enabling him to progress to the general election. His Republican opponent was John McCann, a city councilman.

References

External links
Ammar Campa-Najjar for Congress campaign website

1989 births
American political candidates
American politicians of Mexican descent
American politicians of Palestinian descent
California Democrats
Candidates in the 2018 United States elections
Converts to Christianity from Islam
Living people
People from La Mesa, California
People from San Diego County, California
People from the Gaza Strip
Politicians from San Diego
San Diego State University alumni
Candidates in the 2020 United States elections